Brunswick Palace ( or Braunschweiger Residenzschloss) on the Bohlweg in the centre of the city of Brunswick, was the residence of the Brunswick dukes from 1753 to 8 November 1918.

History 

Work on the first building was begun in 1718 under the direction of Hermann Korb. After this building burned down in 1830, a second palace was built by Carl Theodor Ottmer, being completed in 1841. This was completely demolished in 1960 at the direction of Brunswick's city council due to the heavy damage it had suffered in air raids during the Second World War. The Palace Park was laid out on the resulting waste ground. This was completely removed in the spring of 2005 – following another resolution of the city council in 2004 – in order to erect a large shopping centre, the so-called  (Palace Arcades), by spring 2007 on the land that had been cleared. Its western facade was to consist of a faithful reconstruction of the facade of Ottmer's palace. The building was opened to the public on 6 May 2007.

Distinctions 
 2009: Peter Joseph Krahe Prize

Gallery

Sources 
 Bernd Wedemeyer:  2. Aufl., Braunschweig 1993

References

External links 

 Photo gallery of the construction of the Palace Arcades in Brunswick 

History of Brunswick
Castles in Lower Saxony
Rebuilt buildings and structures in Germany
Palace
Buildings and structures in Germany destroyed during World War II